Rachid is a town in central Mauritania at the foot of the Tagant Plateau . It is located in the Tidjikja Department in the Tagant region.

Nearby towns and villages include Barka, Casbah des Ait Maouine, Ksar el Khali, and Ouadane.

External links
Satellite map at Maplandia.com

Populated places in Mauritania
Tagant Region